Patrick Melrose is a 2018 five-part drama miniseries starring Benedict Cumberbatch in the titular role. The show is based on a series of semi-autobiographical novels by Edward St Aubyn.

Premise
Over five decades from the 1960s to the early 2000s, wealthy Englishman Patrick Melrose attempts to overcome his addictions and demons rooted in abuse by his cruel father and negligent mother.

Cast
 Benedict Cumberbatch as Patrick Melrose
 Sebastian Maltz as young Patrick Melrose
 Jennifer Jason Leigh as Eleanor Melrose
 Hugo Weaving as David Melrose
 Jessica Raine as Julia
 Pip Torrens as Nicholas Pratt
 Prasanna Puwanarajah as Johnny Hall
 Holliday Grainger as Bridget Watson Scott
 Indira Varma as Anne Moore
 Anna Madeley as Mary Melrose
 Blythe Danner as Nancy
 Celia Imrie as Kettle
 Harriet Walter as Princess Margaret
 Allison Williams as Marianne
 Morfydd Clark as Debbie Hickman
 Marcus Smith as Robert Melrose

Production
It was announced in February 2017 that Benedict Cumberbatch would star in and produce a television adaptation of Edward St Aubyn’s Patrick Melrose book series, that would air on Showtime in the United States and Sky Atlantic in the United Kingdom. David Nicholls wrote the five episodes of the series, with Edward Berger directing. In July, Jennifer Jason Leigh and Hugo Weaving joined as Patrick’s mother and father, and Anna Madeley was cast as Patrick’s wife. Allison Williams and Blythe Danner joined in August 2017, with filming begun by October in Glasgow.

Release
The first trailer debuted in April 2018, and the series premiered on May 12 on Showtime. The series consecutively streamed new episodes on CraveTV in Canada. It was shown on Sky Atlantic in the UK, and Sky Vision handled international sales of the series.

Episodes

Reception

Critical response
The series was praised for Cumberbatch's performance. It currently has a 90% rating on Rotten Tomatoes, and a score of 80/100 on Metacritic. In 2019, the series was ranked 51st on The Guardian newspaper's list of the 100 best TV shows of the 21st century.

US ratings

Accolades

References

External links
 
 
 
 

2010s American drama television miniseries
2010s British television miniseries
2018 American television series debuts
2018 British television series debuts
2018 British television series endings
Alcohol abuse in television
Child abuse in fiction
English-language television shows
Incest in television
Rape in television
Showtime (TV network) original programming
Sky Atlantic original programming
Television shows based on British novels
Television shows set in New York City
Works about addiction